Jean-Christophe Spinosi (born 2 September 1964) is a French conductor and violinist, the founder of French orchestra Ensemble Matheus.

Life and career 
In 1991 he created the Ensemble Matheus in Brest, an orchestra which accompanies him throughout the world.

In 2005, the Ensemble Matheus made a series of recordings devoted to Vivaldi: they produced several albums and four operas. Simultaneously, he has continued to interpret the classical and romantic repertoire as well as many pieces from the 20th and 21st centuries.

Different productions have since enabled Spinosi to enjoy musical friendships with artists such as Cecilia Bartoli, Marie-Nicole Lemieux and Philippe Jaroussky, with whom he recorded the album Heroes for EMI-Virgin Classics, a disc whose sales achieved triple-gold status.

From 2007, Spinosi conducted new opera productions every season with the Ensemble Matheus at the Théâtre du Châtelet, and he still regularly performs at the Théâtre des Champs-Elysées, and the Theater an der Wien or the Wiener Staatsoper.

For several years he has worked with stage-directors including Pierrick Sorin (for Rossini's La Pietra del Paragone in 2007 and 2014), Oleg Kulik (for Monteverdi's Vespers for the Blessed Virgin in 2009), or again Claus Guth (for Handel's Messiah at the Theater an der Wien, 2009), Patrice Caurier and Moshe Leiser (for Rossini’s Otello at the Théâtre des Champs-Elysées and Salzburg Festival in 2014).

Spinosi has worked regularly with numerous orchestras including the Deutsches Symphonie-Orchester Berlin, the Orchestre de Paris, the Orchestra of Wiener Staatsoper, the Orchestre Philharmonique de Monte-Carlo, the hr-Sinfonieorchester Frankfurt, the Orchestre National du Capitole de Toulouse, the Scottish Chamber Orchestra, the New Japan Philharmonic, the Royal Stockholm Philharmonic, the Rundfunk-Sinfonieorchester Berlin, the Wiener Symphoniker, the ORF Radio Symphonieorchester Wien, the Orquesta de Castilla y Leon, the City of Birmingham Symphony Orchestra, the NDR Radiophilharmonie Hannover, the Mozarteum Orchester Salzburg, the Orchestre du Festival de Verbier, the Handel and Haydn Society from Boston, the Moscow Chamber Orchestra, the Osaka Philharmonic Orchestra, the Konzerthausorchester Berlin, the Orchestra of Staatsoper Hamburg.  Spinosi appeared to conduct the Berlin Philharmoniker in 2021.

Spinosi and Cecilia Bartoli continued their close collaboration with two more Rossini operas, Otello at the Théâtre des Champs-Elysées and at the Salzburg Festival and La Cenerentola at the Salzburg Festival.

His last two recordings for Deutsche Grammophon – Miroirs with the Ensemble Matheus and Lucifer with the Orchestre Philharmonique de Monte-Carlo – received the “Choc” distinction from Classica magazine.

Discography 
 La fida ninfa, Vivaldi, 2008 with Veronica Cangemi, Sandrine Piau, Marie Nicole Lemieux, Lorenzo Regazzo, Philippe Jaroussky, Topi Lehtipuu, Sara Mingardo, Christian Senn; Ensemble Matheus. Opus111/Naïve
 Nisi Dominus, Stabat Mater, Vivaldi, 2008with Marie Nicole Lemieux, Philippe Jaroussky; Ensemble Matheus. Opus111/Naïve
 La pietra del paragone, Rossini, DVD, 2007  with François Lis,  Christian Senn,  José Manuel Zapata, Sonia Prina, Jennifer Holloway, Laura Giordano,  Joan Martín-Royo,  Filippo Polinelli; Chorus of Teatro Regio di Parma; Ensemble Matheus. Recorded live at Théâtre du Châtelet, Paris, Opus111/Naïve
 Vivaldi, Heroes, 2006  with Philippe Jaroussky, Ensemble Matheus. Opus111/Naïve
 Griselda, Vivaldi, 2006 with Simone Kermes, Marie-Nicole Lemieux, Veronica Cangemi, Philippe Jaroussky, Stefano Ferrari, Iestyn Davies; Ensemble Matheus. Opus111/Naïve
 Orlando furioso, Vivaldi, 2004   with Marie-Nicole Lemieux, Jennifer Larmore, Veronica Cangemi, Ann Hallenberg, Philippe Jaroussky, Lorenzo Regazzo; Ensemble Matheus. Opus111/Naïve
 De Lhoyer: Duos et Concerto Pour Guitare, 2004  with Philippe Spinosi (guitar), Duo Spinosi, Ensemble Matheus. Opus111/Naïve
 La verità in cimento, Vivaldi, 2003 with Gemma Bertagnolli, Philippe Jaroussky, Sara Mingardo, Guillemette Laurens, Nathalie Stutzmann; Ensemble Matheus. Opus111/Naïve
 La notte, La tempesta di mare, Il gardellino, Vivaldi, 2003 with Ensemble Matheus. Opus111/Naive
 Vivaldi: Concerti Con Molti Strumenti, Vol. II, 1997 with Ensemble Matheus. Pierre Verany
 Vivaldi: Concerti Con Molti Strumenti, 1996 with Ensemble Matheus. Pierre Verany

References

External links 
 Official Ensemble Matheus home page 
 

French male conductors (music)
20th-century French male classical violinists
21st-century French male classical violinists
French performers of early music
1964 births
Living people
Chevaliers of the Ordre des Arts et des Lettres
21st-century French conductors (music)
Naïve Records artists
Deutsche Grammophon artists
People from Corsica
Musicians from Brest, France
20th-century French conductors (music)